Robert Dean Garton (born August 18, 1933) is an American former politician from the state of Indiana. A Republican, he served in the Indiana Senate from 1970 to 2006. Garton previously served in the United States Marine Corps from 1955 to 1957, reaching the rank of First lieutenant. From 1969 to 1970, Garton served on the Indiana Civil Rights Commission. Garton served as President pro tempore of the Indiana Senate from 1980 to 2006. In 2006, Garton lost renomination to Greg Walker.

References

External links
Project Vote Smart – Senator Robert D. Garton (IN) profile
Our Campaigns – Senator Robert D. Garton (IN) profile

Republican Party Indiana state senators
Santa Clara University alumni
1933 births
Cornell University alumni
Iowa State University alumni
21st-century American politicians
Living people